Julia Karlsson (born 23 June 1996) is a Swedish racing cyclist. She rode in the women's road race event at the 2017 UCI Road World Championships.

References

External links

1996 births
Living people
Swedish female cyclists
Place of birth missing (living people)